This is a list of the cities proclaimed free royal cities in Croatia's history.

1209 – Varaždin – Granted by King Andrew II
1231 – Vukovar – Granted by Coloman of Galicia-Lodomeria
1234 – Virovitica – Granted by Coloman of Galicia-Lodomeria
1242 – Zagreb – Granted by King Béla IV via the Golden Bull of 1242
1242 – Samobor – Granted by King Béla IV.
1244 – Ozalj – Granted by King Béla IV.
1245 – Križevci – Granted by Ban Stjepan, confirmed by King Béla IV in 1253
1262 – Bihać (today in Bosnia and Herzegovina, was Croatian at the time) – Granted by King Béla IV
1356 – Koprivnica – Confirmed by King Louis I
1765 – Požega – Granted by Empress Maria Theresa
1781 – Karlovac – Granted by Emperor Joseph II
1788 – Hrvatska Kostajnica – Granted by Emperor Joseph II
1809 – Osijek
1874 – Bjelovar – Granted by Ban Ivan Mažuranić
1874 – Sisak

Sources
 

Lists of populated places in Croatia
Croatia history-related lists